Alice Halicka or Alicja Halicka (20 December 1894 – 1 January 1975) was a Polish painter who spent most of her life in France.

Biography
Alicja Halicka was born in Kraków and studied with Józef Pankiewicz there. She moved to Paris in 1912 where she studied at Académie Ranson under Paul Sérusier and Maurice Denis. There she  met and married the Cubist painter Louis Marcoussis in 1913. In 1921 she showed cubist work together with her husband at the Société des Artistes Indépendants. She also exhibited her work at the Galerie Georges Petit, Paris (1930–31), Le Centaure, Brussels, the Leicester Galleries, London (1934), the Marie Harriman Gallery, New York (1936), Julian Levy Gallery, New York (1937). Halicka painted in various styles but also produced work in fabric, including Romances capitonnées, and even made set designs for ballets which were performed at the Metropolitan Opera of New York and Covent Garden, London.

She spent World War II in France and wrote a memoir afterwards called Hier, souvenirs, published in 1946. Halicka died in Paris in 1975.

Citations

References
Birnbaum, Paula J. (1999). “Alice Halicka’s Self-Effacement.” In Diaspora and Modern Visual Culture: Representing Africans and Jews, edited by Nicholas Mirzoeff, 207–23. London/New York: Routledge, 1999.
Birnbaum, Paula J. (2011) Women Artists in Interwar France: Framing Femininities.  Aldershot: Ashgate, 2011. Print.
Troy, Nancy J. (2006). "'The Societe Anonyme: modernism for America'; UCLA Hammer Museum, Los Angeles." Artforum International 45.2 (2006) : 255-256. Print.
Cailler, Pierre, ed. (1962). Alice Halicka: Documents. Geneva: Editions Pierre Cailler (Les Cahiers d’Art - Documents Series).
Halicka, Alice. Hier (Souvenirs) (1946). Paris: Editions de Pavois.
Warnod, Jeanine. “Alice Halicka et ses souvenirs.” Terre d’Europe 48 (May 1974).

External links
 Alice Halicka on artnet
 Alicja Halicka - Życie i twórczość, biography at Culture.pl

1894 births
1975 deaths
Textile artists
Polish emigrants to France
20th-century French painters
Women textile artists
Artists from Paris
20th-century women textile artists
20th-century textile artists
French women painters
French women memoirists
20th-century memoirists
20th-century French women writers